Mangels is a surname of Dutch and German origin. It may refer to:

Alan Mangels (born 1956), Australian football player
Alby Mangels (born 1948), Australian filmmaker
Andy Mangels (born 1966), American science fiction writer
Reed Mangels (born 1955), American nutritionist
William F. Mangels (1866–1958), American businessman and inventor

See also
Mangel (surname)
Mengler

German-language surnames
Dutch-language surnames